Jordan Daniel Morgan (born September 15, 1991) is an American-born naturalized Slovenian professional basketball player for Konyaspor of the Turkish Basketbol Süper Ligi (BSL). He played college basketball at Michigan. He represents the Slovenia basketball team internationally.

Early life and high school career 
Morgan was born Jordan Daniel Konkoly in Scott Air Force Base in Illinois to Meredith Morgan née Konkoly and Bobby Deloach on September 15, 1991.  His biological father was largely absent in his life from birth. His mother raised him as a single mother until she married his adoptive father, Jim Morgan in 2001. He was adopted by his stepfather when he was 12 years old and he took his last name. Morgan graduated from the University of Detroit Jesuit High School and Academy. At Detroit Jesuit, Morgan played on the varsity basketball team all four years and was a starter for three.  Over his high school career, he averaged 14.5 points, 10.1 rebounds, and 2.3 blocks per game. During his senior year Morgan averaged 20 points per game.

Morgan verbally committed to Michigan on December 18, 2007; his other scholarship offers were from Central Michigan, Oakland, and Xavier.

College career 

At the University of Michigan, Morgan redshirted his freshman season on the Michigan Wolverines men's basketball team due to a knee injury. Morgan then played 142 games for Michigan from the 2010–11 to 2013–14 seasons at the power forward position. 142 games was a school record that was tied by Zak Irvin, and later surpassed by Muhammad-Ali Abdur-Rahkman (144) during the 2017–18 season. He led the Big Ten Conference in field goal percentage 66.1% (Big Ten), 62.7% (all games). He made 63.1% of his field goal attempts and scored 973 points in his Michigan career. During his sophomore season, the team clinched a share of the 2011–12 Big Ten Conference season regular season championship. As a junior on the Michigan team that became runners-up in the 2013 NCAA Men's Division I Basketball Championship Game, Morgan earned Big Ten All-Defensive honors. During his senior season, Michigan clinched its first outright (unshared) Big Ten Conference championship since 1985–86.

Morgan completed his B.S.E. in industrial and operations engineering from the University of Michigan College of Engineering in April 2012, after his third year at Michigan. He was also selected to the Michigan honor society Order of Angell. In 2014, Morgan earned his M.S. in manufacturing engineering, also from Michigan. When President Barack Obama spoke at the University of Michigan in April 2014 to advocate raising the federal minimum wage, Obama praised Morgan for undertaking graduate studies in engineering and being a student-athlete at Michigan. The White House also sent Morgan a letter signed by Obama congratulating Morgan for his academic achievements and describing him as "part of an elite community of scholars and leaders."

Professional career
After going undrafted in the 2014 NBA draft, Morgan played with the Minnesota Timberwolves for NBA Summer League. On July 27, 2014, Morgan signed with Pallacanestro Virtus Roma of the Italian Lega Basket Serie A. In 34 games, he averaged 8.1 points and 6.5 rebounds.

On July 23, 2015, Morgan signed with Hermine de Nantes Atlantique. He averaged 9.3 points and 5.8 rebounds per game. On January 26, 2016, Morgan signed with Paris-Levallois. On March 22, he parted ways with Paris-Levallois. Three days later, he was acquired by the Canton Charge of the NBA Development League. On March 26, he made his debut for the Charge in a 122–111 win over the Erie BayHawks, recording one point, six rebounds, two assists and one steal in 11 minutes off the bench.

On August 23, 2016, Morgan signed with Kymis of the  Greek Basket League.

On July 4, 2017, he signed a one-year deal with Slovenian club Olimpija.

On July 26, 2019 he has signed a contract with Pınar Karşıyaka of the Turkish Basketbol Süper Ligi. 

Morgan signed with Russian club UNICS Kazan on June 15, 2020.

On January 16, 2022, he signed with Reyer Venezia of the Lega Basket Serie A.

On June 27, 2022, he has signed with Konyaspor of the Turkish Basketbol Süper Ligi (BSL).

Charitable Endeavors 
After graduating from the University of Michigan, Morgan registered a charitable organization under the name Jordan Morgan Foundation, whose stated mission is "To inform, empower, and inspire academically disadvantaged and socially underserved youth."

References

External links
Eurobasket.com profile
Michigan bio
TBLStat.net Profile

1991 births
Living people
ABA League players
American expatriate basketball people in France
American expatriate basketball people in Greece
American expatriate basketball people in Italy
American expatriate basketball people in Russia
American expatriate basketball people in Slovenia
American expatriate basketball people in Turkey
American men's basketball players
Bandırma B.İ.K. players
Basketball players from Illinois
Basketball players from Detroit
BC UNICS players
Canton Charge players
Centers (basketball)
Karşıyaka basketball players
Kymis B.C. players
KK Olimpija players
Michigan Wolverines men's basketball players
Pallacanestro Virtus Roma players
Metropolitans 92 players
Naturalized citizens of Slovenia
People from St. Clair County, Illinois
Power forwards (basketball)
Reyer Venezia players
Slovenian expatriate basketball people in Russia
Slovenian expatriate basketball people in Turkey
Slovenian men's basketball players
Slovenian people of African-American descent
Sportspeople from Greater St. Louis
University of Detroit Jesuit High School and Academy alumni
University of Michigan College of Engineering alumni